Westfield Oakridge, commonly known as Oakridge, is a shopping mall in San Jose, California, located in the Blossom Valley neighborhood of South San Jose. Established in 1971, Oakridge has been redeveloped multiple times in its history, most recently in 2003, to the cost of $150 million. The anchor stores are Macy's, Target, Nordstrom Rack, and Living Spaces.

History
Westfield Oakridge opened in 1971 with anchors Macy's, Bullock's, and Montgomery Ward. Bullock's closed its Northern California locations in 1983 and sold its Oakridge location to Nordstrom; which opened in the building in 1985. Nordstrom opened a new department store at the competing Valley Fair shopping center in 1987, and the two stores existed simultaneously until 1994 when Nordstrom closed its Oakridge store and sold the building to Sears.

The bankruptcy of Montgomery Ward in 2001 left an empty anchor slot at Oakridge, originally meant to be occupied by The Great Indoors, a Sears-owned home furnishings concept. Instead, the building sat vacant until 2003, when it was remodeled and replaced by a two-level Target store. At the same time, Macy's added 75,000 square feet to its existing footprint, bringing its total square footage to more than 220,000 square feet.

Westfield began a $150 million multi-phase expansion in the Summer of 2002 and was completed in late 2003. The 300,000+ square foot expansion added two new junior anchors - Linens n' Things and a Borders bookstore, as well as a 20-screen Century Theatres cinema and a large food court. A restaurant row with The Cheesecake Factory, California Pizza Kitchen, BJ's Restaurant & Brewhouse, P.F. Chang's China Bistro, and Buca di Beppo fronted the new wing facing Blossom Hill Road.

The bankruptcies and eventual closures of Borders and Linens n' Things led to two new junior anchors at the center: a Nordstrom Rack opened in place of Linens n' Things, while Forever 21 moved from a smaller in-line space to the former Borders store. A 20,000 square-foot H&M opened in 2011, taking over one of the mall's hallways and several tenant spaces in the process.

Westfield purchased the Sears building at Oakridge and two other properties in May 2017.

On January 4, 2018, it was announced that Sears would be closing as part of a plan to close 103 stores nationwide. The store closed end of March 2018. A Living Spaces furniture store took over most of the former Sears building in 2019.

Several of the mall's most notable tenants have shuttered over the last several years with no replacement, including three of the property's five large restaurants (Buca di Beppo, California Pizza Kitchen, and P.F. Chang's) and the mall's Ethan Allen furniture store. A planned GameWorks entertainment center in place of Ethan Allen was announced in 2019, but never materialized. An additional anchor - a 99 Ranch Market - opened in 2022 in space formerly occupied by several smaller tenants.

References

External links

Buildings and structures in San Jose, California
Shopping malls in the San Francisco Bay Area
Oakridge
Economy of San Jose, California
Shopping malls in Santa Clara County, California
Shopping malls established in 1971
1971 establishments in California